Spagnoletti is a surname. Notable people with the surname include:

Charles Spagnoletti (1832–1915), British inventor
Robert Spagnoletti, American jurist